At the 1928 Summer Olympics, thirteen wrestling events were contested, for all men. There were six weight classes in Greco-Roman wrestling and seven classes in freestyle wrestling. The freestyle competitions were held from July 30 to August 1, 1928 and the Greco-Roman events were held from August 2 to August 5, 1928.

Medal summary

Freestyle

Greco-Roman

Participating nations
166 wrestlers from 29 nations competed.  Argentina competed in wrestling for the first time.

Medal table

See also
List of World and Olympic Champions in men's freestyle wrestling
List of World and Olympic Champions in Greco-Roman wrestling

References

External links
 

 
1928 Summer Olympics events
1928